The 1884 New Hampshire gubernatorial election was held on November 4, 1884. Republican nominee Moody Currier defeated Democratic nominee John M. Hill with 50.33% of the vote.

General election

Candidates
Major party candidates
Moody Currier, Republican
John M. Hill, Democratic

Other candidates
Larkin D. Mason, Prohibition
George Carpenter, Greenback

Results

References

1884
New Hampshire
Gubernatorial